Aisam-ul-Haq Qureshi and Jean-Julien Rojer were the defending champions, but Qureshi chose not to participate this year. Rojer played alongside Horia Tecău, but lost in the first round to Grigor Dimitrov and Pierre-Hugues Herbert. 
Eric Butorac and Raven Klaasen won the title, defeating Treat Huey and Jack Sock in the final, 6-4, 6-3.

Seeds

Draw

Draw

References
 Main Draw

Stockholm Open - Doubles
2014 Stockholm Open